Kevin John Patrick McDonald KC*HS (b. 18 August 1947, Stoke-on-Trent) is the Archbishop Emeritus of the Roman Catholic Archdiocese of Southwark, England.

Life 
Born in Stoke-on-Trent, from 1958 to 1965 McDonald attended the Christian Brothers' Grammar School there, St. Joseph's College, Stoke-on-Trent. He read Latin at Birmingham University from 1965 to 1968.

In 1968 he was accepted as a student for the Archdiocese of Birmingham and was ordained priest on 20 July 1974 in the Metropolitan Cathedral of St Chad in Birmingham. From 1976 to 1985 he was a lecturer in moral theology at Oscott College.  He became secretary at the Pontifical Council for Promoting Christian Unity in Rome 1985–1993.  McDonald earned a Doctorate of Sacred Theology from the Pontifical University of Saint Thomas Aquinas, Angelicum in 1989 with a dissertation entitled Communion and friendship : a framework for ecumenical dialogue in ethics.

In 1993 he returned to England and became the Parish priest of English Martyrs, Sparkhill until 1998. It was while in Sparkhill that McDonald developed his interest in inter-religious dialogue. From 1998 until 2001 he was Rector of Oscott seminary. McDonald was consecrated the 11th Bishop of Northampton on 2 May 2001 by Bishop Leo McCartie, assisted by Archbishops Patrick Kelly and Vincent Nichols.

Archbishop of Southwark
On 8 December 2003, McDonald was installed as the Archbishop of Southwark on the feast of the Immaculate Conception, the patronal feast of the archdiocese. After becoming archbishop, McDonald suffered with ill health, spending a significant portion of 2008 on sick leave. Besides suffering from severe osteoarthritis, he underwent a triple heart bypass. He was rumoured to be Pope Benedict XVI's first choice to replace Cormac Murphy-O'Connor as Archbishop of Westminster. However, on 4 December 2009, following the announcement of Vincent Nichols as Archbishop of Westminster, McDonald resigned his post on health grounds.

Personal
He has an elder brother and sister and two younger brothers. He has nine nephews and nieces and three great-nephews.

References

This article is derived from the contents of this page, which have been released under the GFDL in an email to the Wikimedia Foundation.

External links

Roman Catholic Archdiocese of Southwark
 Parishes of the diocese

People from Stoke-on-Trent
21st-century Roman Catholic archbishops in the United Kingdom
1947 births
Living people
Pontifical University of Saint Thomas Aquinas alumni
People educated at St. Joseph's College, Stoke-on-Trent
Alumni of the University of Birmingham
Roman Catholic archbishops of Southwark
Clergy from Staffordshire
Roman Catholic bishops of Northampton